Philip Henry Bowyer (February 6, 1860 – January 24, 1933) was an editor, publisher and politician in Ontario, Canada. He represented Kent East in the Legislative Assembly of Ontario from 1905 to 1911 as a Conservative member.

He was born in Toronto. In 1882, Bowyer married Agnes Yocom. From 1880 to 1893, he was editor of the Ridgetown Standard; in 1895, he became editor of the Ridgetown Dominion.

References

External links
 

1860 births
1933 deaths
Progressive Conservative Party of Ontario MPPs
Canadian newspaper editors
Canadian male journalists